The 2009 AFF Futsal Championship was held in Ho Chi Minh City, Vietnam from 8 June to 14 June 2009.

Group stage

Group A

Group B

Knockout stage

Semi-finals

Third place play-off

Final

Champions

Awards 
Fair-Play Trophy: 
MVP:  Keattiyot Chalaemkhet
Best Goalkeeper:  Dang Phuoc Anh
Best Goalscorer:  Sayan Karmadi – 10 goals

References 
General
AFF Futsal Championship 2009 schedule & results – ASEAN Football Federation
ASEAN Futsal Championship 2009 - Rec.Sport.Soccer Statistics Foundation

Specific

External links
 Old website (Archived)
 Official website

AFF Futsal Championship
AFF Futsal
2009
Fut
2009  in Asian futsal